Ranginui Joseph Isaac Walker  (1 March 1932 – 29 February 2016) was an influential New Zealand academic, author, and activist of Māori and Lebanese descent. "I think he was the Māori commentator for a very long period," his biographer, Professor Paul Spoonley, has said. Walker wrote about the struggles for Māori land rights and cultural identity and, says Spoonley, "confronted Pakeha about their lack of understanding and prejudices to Māori" in his books and regular columns for the weekly New Zealand Listener and the monthly Metro magazine throughout the 1980s and 90s.

Early life
Walker was born in 1932 into a farming family on the tribal lands of Whakatōhea, near Ōpōtiki in the Bay of Plenty. He credited his aunt Wairata, a foster mother, for helping him to learn Māori language and culture at a young age. In his own history of Whakatōhea (2007) Walker explained that at this time Māori language and culture were unfashionable, and that his generation was expected to assimilate.

Education 
Walker was sent to St Peter's Maori College Auckland at the age of twelve. He went on to attend Auckland Teachers' Training College, and worked as a primary school teacher for 10 years. He gained a Bachelor of Arts and a Diploma in Teaching in 1962, a Master's in 1965, and finished his doctorate in 1970. The title of his doctoral thesis was The social adjustment of the Maori to urban living in Auckland.

Personal life 
Walker met Deidre Dobson at Auckland Teachers' Training College in Epsom, and the couple were married in 1953. They had three children. According to biographer Professor Paul Spoonley, "The acceptance of intermarriage was an issue for both sets of parents: Walker's parents were concerned that Deidre was a Pākehā and not Roman Catholic; Deidre's were concerned that their daughter was to marry a Māori."

Walker commented that the country's race problems would be solved 'in the bedrooms of the nation.'

Career and activism
Walker was a member of Māori activist group Ngā Tamatoa and Secretary of the Auckland District Māori Council from 1969 to 1973 and chairman from 1974 to 1990.

In 1993 he became the Professor and Head of Māori Studies at the University of Auckland.

In 2003, Walker became a member of the Waitangi Tribunal. He held a strong belief in Maori Identity, and had stated that William Hobson's declaration that "He iwi tahi tātou", meaning "We are now one people", in the Treaty of Waitangi, was a cultural attack on the indigenous people of New Zealand.

Awards and honours
In the 2001 Queen's Birthday Honours, Walker was appointed a Distinguished Companion of the New Zealand Order of Merit, for services to Māori. When the New Zealand government restored titular honours in 2009, he declined redesignation as a Knight Companion of the New Zealand Order of Merit.

In 2009, Walker received a Prime Minister's Award for Literary Achievement

Following Walker's death in 2016, Prime Minister John Key said Walker was "not only an insightful commentator on important historical and contemporary issues but was a tireless and passionate advocate for Māori".

Former Prime Minister Helen Clark tweeted "Greatly saddened by news of death of Ranginui Walker, one of New Zealand's finest people; eminent academic & author."

Published works 

Walker published a number of books, including:

Perceptions and Attitudes of the New Generation of Maoris to Pakeha Domination (1981)
History of Maori Activism (1983)
The Treaty of Waitangi (1983)
The Political Development of the Maori People in New Zealand (1984)
The Meaning of Biculturalism (1986)
Nga Mamae o te Iwi Maori: Te Ripoata o te Hui i Turangawaewae (1987)
Nga Tau Tohetohe The Years of Anger (1987)
Ka Whawhai Tonu Matou / Struggle Without End (1990) Second Edition (2004)
Liberating Maori from Educational Subjection (1991)
Nga Pepa a Ranginui The Walker Papers (1997)
He Tipua The Life and Times of Sir Apirana Ngata (2001)
Opotiki-Mai-Tawhiti Capital of Whakatohea (2007)

Notes

Sources

 Margie Thomson, "Bridging the Gap", Dominion Post, 9 May 2009, "Your Weekend", p. 10.
 Paul Spoonley, Mata Toa: The Life and Times of Ranginui Walker, Penguin, Auckland 2009.

1932 births
2016 deaths
Māori activists
New Zealand Māori academics
Distinguished Companions of the New Zealand Order of Merit
New Zealand people of Lebanese descent
People educated at Hato Petera College, Auckland
People from Ōpōtiki
University of Auckland alumni
Academic staff of the University of Auckland
Members of the Waitangi Tribunal
Whakatōhea people